The Cirilo Rodríguez Journalism Award is an award given annually by the Segovia Press Association (APS), in collaboration with the  (FAPE). It "is destined to publicly recognize the best work of a correspondent or special envoy of a Spanish media outlet abroad" during the preceding year, and the jury "can contemplate the trajectory of the candidate" throughout their professional career. The winner receives a prize of €6,000 and a glass trophy named Lente de la tierra (Lens of the Earth), made by the Real Fábrica de Cristales de La Granja.

Considered one of the most prestigious awards of its type in Spain, it was created in honor of the journalist , and has been held every year since its creation in 1984. Journalists and communication companies are also part of the jury, and it is funded by public institutions of Segovia and its province. In recent years, winners have received an audience with the Prince or Princess of Asturias, and Queen Letizia has accepted the honorary presidency of the award.

Winners

References

External links
 Awards page at the  

1984 establishments in Spain
Awards established in 1984
Castilian culture
Journalism awards
Spanish awards